Shaista Wahab has written Dari language books. Her book A Brief History of Afghanistan was published in 2007. Wahab was a librarian and professor at the University of Nebraska at Omaha where she coordinated the Arthur Paul Afghanistan Collection in the Dr. C.C. and Mabel L. Criss Library Archives & Special Collections. An oral history specialist, she served as a consultant to the Afghanistan Unveiled (2002–2003) film project by Independent Lens, which was later picked up by PBS.

References

External links
 Arthur Paul Afghanistan Collection, Archives & Special Collections, Dr. C.C. and Mabel L. Criss Library, University of Nebraska at Omaha
 Arthur Paul Afghanistan Collection Bibliography, Volume I: Pashto and Dari Titles, Lincoln: Dageforde Publishing, 1995.
 Arthur Paul Afghanistan Collection Bibliography - Volume II: English and European Languages, Lincoln: NE.: Dageforde Publishing, 2000.
 Afghanistan Unveiled

Afghan educators
Living people
21st-century Afghan historians
Women historians
University of Nebraska Omaha faculty
21st-century Afghan women writers
Year of birth missing (living people)